Tectonatica is a genus of sea snails, marine gastropod molluscs in the subfamily Naticinae of the family Naticidae, the moon snails.

Fossil record
Fossils of Tectonatica are found in marine strata from the Eocene until the Quaternary (age range: from 61.7 to 0.0 million years ago.).  Fossils are known from various localities in Europe, North America, South America and Japan.

Distribution
This marine genus occurs in the Indo-West Pacific and off Australia (New South Wales, Northern Territory, Queensland, Tasmania, Victoria, Western Australia).

Species
Species within the genus Tectonatica include:
 Tectonatica bougei (Sowerby, 1908)
 Tectonatica impervia (Philippi, 1845)
 Tectonatica lactinea (X.-T. Ma & S.-P. Zhang, 1993)
 Tectonatica micra (Haas, 1953)
 † Tectonatica occulta (Deshayes, 1864) 
 Tectonatica prietoi (Hidalgo, 1873)
 Tectonatica pusilla (Say, 1822)
 Tectonatica rizzae (Philippi, 1844)
 Tectonatica robillardi (Sowerby, 1894)
 Tectonatica sagraiana (d'Orbigny, 1842)
 Tectonatica shorehami (Pritchard & Gatliff, 1900)
 Tectonatica suffusa (Reeve, 1855)
 Tectonatica tecta (Anton, 1838)
 † Tectonatica tectula (Sacco, 1890) 
 Tectonatica violacea  (G. B. Sowerby I, 1825) 
 Tectonatica zonulata (Thiele, 1930)
Species brought into synonymy 
 Tectonatica clausiformis Oyama, 1969: synonym of Cryptonatica affinis (Gmelin, 1791)
 Tectonatica filosa (Philippi, 1845) : synonym of Tectonatica sagraiana (d'Orbigny, 1842)
 Tectonatica flammulata (Requien, 1848): synonym of Tectonatica sagraiana (d'Orbigny, 1842)
 Tectonatica janthostomoides Kuroda & Habe, 1949: synonym of Cryptonatica janthostomoides (Kuroda & Habe, 1949)
 Tectonatica operculata (Jeffreys, 1885): synonym of Cryptonatica operculata (Jeffreys, 1885)
 Tectonatica pavimentum (Recluz, 1844): synonym of Tanea pavimentum (Recluz, 1844)
 Tectonatica rikuzenensis Tiba, 1985: synonym of Cryptonatica ranzii (Kuroda, 1961)
 Tectonatica unicolor (Ma & Zhang, 1993): synonym of Tectonatica lactinea (X.-T. Ma & S.-P. Zhang, 1993)
 Tectonatica venustula (Philippi, 1851): synonym of Notocochlis venustula (Philippi, 1851): synonym of Notocochlis gualteriana (Récluz, 1844)

References

 Powell A. W. B. (1979), New Zealand Mollusca, William Collins Publishers Ltd, Auckland, New Zealand 
 Kabat, A.R. (1991) The classification of the Naticidae (Mollusca: Gastropoda): Review and analysis of the supraspecific taxa. Bull. Mus. Comp. Zool., 152, 417-449.
 Wilson, B. 1993. Australian Marine Shells. Prosobranch Gastropods. Kallaroo, Western Australia : Odyssey Publishing Vol. 1 408 pp.
 Gofas, S.; Le Renard, J.; Bouchet, P. (2001). Mollusca, in: Costello, M.J. et al. (Ed.) (2001). European register of marine species: a check-list of the marine species in Europe and a bibliography of guides to their identification. Collection Patrimoines Naturels, 50: pp. 180–213
 Rolán E., 2005. Malacological Fauna From The Cape Verde Archipelago. Part 1, Polyplacophora and Gastropoda.
 Robba E., Pedriali L. & Quaggiotto E. (2016). Eocene, Oligocene and Miocene naticid gastropods of northern Italy. Rivista Italiana di Paleontologia e Stratigrafia. 122(2): 109-234

External links
 Huelsken, T. et al. (2008) The Naticidae (Mollusca: Gastropoda) of Isola del Giglio (Tuscany, Italy): Shell characters, live animals, and a molecular analysis of egg masses. Zootaxa, 1770:1-40.
 Sacco, F. (1890). Catalogo paleontologico del bacino terziaro del Piemonte. Bollettino della Società Geologica Italiana. 8(3): 281-356; 9(2): 185-340

Naticidae